Isparta Province is a province in southwestern Turkey. Its adjacent provinces are Afyon to the northwest, Burdur to the southwest, Antalya to the south, and Konya to the east. It has an area of 8,993 km2 and a population of 448,298 up from 434,771 (1990). The provincial capital is Isparta.

The province is well known for its apples, sour cherries, grapes, roses and rose products, and carpets. The best fertile lands are in the area named Uluborlu. The province is situated in the Göller Bölgesi (Lakes Area) of Turkey's Mediterranean Region and has many freshwater lakes.

Districts

Isparta province is divided into 13 districts (capital district in bold):
Aksu
Atabey
Eğirdir
Gelendost
Gönen
Isparta
Keçiborlu
Şarkikaraağaç
Senirkent
Sütçüler
Uluborlu
Yalvaç
Yenişarbademli

Sites of interest

Kovada Lake and Kızıldağ National Parks, Isparta Gölcüğü, Çamyol and Kuyucak forest recreation areas, Eğirdir oak and Sütçüler forest conservation areas, Eğirdir, Uluborlu and Yalvaç castles, Antiochia in Pisidia and Apollonia antiquity cities, Ertokuş and Dündar Bey old theological schools (medrese), Isparta Hızır Bey, Kutlu Bey, Firdevs Bey, İplik, Eğirdir Hızır Bey, Barla Çaşnigir, Uluğbey Veli Baba mosques, Firdevs Bey Bazaar, Eğirdir Inn (caravansary), Ertokuş Hanı Inn, Baba Sultan Mousoleum, Isparta and Yalvaç Museums.

In 2020, the ancient 10 meters height rock mass of symbolic importance, which was in a village in Yalvaç district, was blown by treasure hunters.

Geography 
Isparta lies in the northernmost part of the Pamphylian basin, wedged between the continental Bey Dağları and Anatolian blocks. This area is known as the Isparta Angle. The Isparta Angle is a result of the Anatolian Plate's rotation from the early Paleocene to the early Pliocene. This is a very seismically active area.

Economy 
As of 2012, there are 178,162 hectares of agricultural land in Isparta province, of which 28.8% (37,184 ha) is used for fruit growing. 

Isparta province accounts for 23.4% of all apple production in Turkey as of 2012. The majority of the province's apple production is done in three districts: Eğirdir, Gelendost, and Senirkent. Together, these three districts account for 73.2% of the province's apple production.

Notable people
 Erkan Mumcu
 Necmettin Sadak
 Süleyman Demirel
 Zeki Demirkubuz

Gallery

See also
List of populated places in Isparta Province

References

External links 

  Isparta governor's official website
  Isparta municipality's official website
  Isparta weather forecast information
  Isparta city guide
 (Turkish) Isparta info website